Velimir Vidić (born 12 April 1979) is a Bosnian-Herzegovinian  retired football defender who last played for NK Vinogradar in Croatia. Vidić also has Croatian citizenship.

Club career
He played in several foreign clubs, such as MŠK Žilina in the Corgoň liga and FC Gossau.

International career
He made his debut for Bosnia and Herzegovina in a February 2005 friendly match away against Iran and has earned a total of 10 caps, scoring no goals. His final international was a January 2008 friendly match against Japan.

References

External links

1979 births
Living people
People from Vitez
Association football defenders
Bosnia and Herzegovina footballers
Bosnia and Herzegovina international footballers
NK Vitez players
FK Sloboda Tuzla players
HŠK Zrinjski Mostar players
NK Široki Brijeg players
MŠK Žilina players
FC Gossau players
HNK Šibenik players
RNK Split players
NK Vinogradar players
First League of the Federation of Bosnia and Herzegovina players
Premier League of Bosnia and Herzegovina players
Slovak Super Liga players
Swiss Challenge League players
Croatian Football League players
Bosnia and Herzegovina expatriate footballers
Expatriate footballers in Slovakia
Bosnia and Herzegovina expatriate sportspeople in Slovakia
Expatriate footballers in Switzerland
Bosnia and Herzegovina expatriate sportspeople in Switzerland
Expatriate footballers in Croatia
Bosnia and Herzegovina expatriate sportspeople in Croatia